Mount Baker National Recreation Area is a United States national recreation area in northern Washington about  south of the Canada–US border within the Mount Baker-Snoqualmie National Forest.

The recreation area was established in 1984 by an act of the U.S. Congress primarily to accommodate the use of snowmobiles during the winter months on the southern slopes of Mount Baker. There are also many hiking trails in the recreation area. Mount Baker NRA is adjacent to the Mount Baker Wilderness area where snowmobiling is not permitted.

External links
 Mount Baker National Recreation Area official site

National Recreation Areas of the United States
Protected areas of Washington (state)
Protected areas of Whatcom County, Washington
Mount Baker-Snoqualmie National Forest